Gadik may refer to:
Gədik, Azerbaijan
Gadik, Iran, a village in Kerman Province